Micrelephas interruptus is a moth in the family Crambidae. It was described by Zeller in 1866. It is found in Venezuela, Colombia and Peru.

References

Moths described in 1866
Moths of South America